Hans Sigfrid Hansson (18 January 1901 – 13 November 1971) was a Swedish wrestler. He competed in the freestyle featherweight and the Greco-Roman bantamweight events at the 1924 Summer Olympics.

References

External links
 

1901 births
1971 deaths
Olympic wrestlers of Sweden
Wrestlers at the 1924 Summer Olympics
Swedish male sport wrestlers
Sportspeople from Skåne County
20th-century Swedish people